Primeau is a surname of French origin meaning prime or first or cousin. Variations include Primeaux, Primo, Premo, Promo. The name refers to:

Cayden Primeau (born 1999), American professional ice hockey player, son of Keith Primeau
Ernest John Primeau (1909–1989), American Roman Catholic prelate and former Bishop of Manchester
Gaëtan Primeau (born 1941), Canadian politician
Joe Primeau (1906–1989), Canadian professional ice hockey player
Jo Primeau, Canadian drag queen
Keith Primeau (born 1971), Canadian professional ice hockey player, father of Cayden Primeau
Kevin Primeau (born 1955), Canadian professional ice hockey player
Louis Primeau, Canadian fur trader
Wayne Primeau (born 1976), Canadian professional ice hockey player

See also
Verdell Primeaux, Native American singer and songwriter